Jelliffe is a surname. Notable people with the surname include:

 Derrick and Patrice Jelliffe, authors and researchers of pediatric issues, notably infant formula
 Rick Jelliffe (born 1960), Australian computer programmer and promoter of the Microsoft Office Open XML document format
 Roger Jelliffe (born 1929), American physician, professor of medicine at the University of Southern California (USC), and developer of the Jelliffe formula for estimating creatinine clearance
 Smith Ely Jelliffe (1866–1945), American neurologist and psychiatrist